Once Upon a Time... in Bethlehem is a 2019 Italian Christmas fantasy comedy film written and directed by Ficarra e Picone.

Cast
Salvatore Ficarra as Salvo
Valentino Picone as Valentino
Massimo Popolizio as King Herod
Roberta Mattei as Rebecca
Giacomo Mattia as Isaac
Giovanna Marchetti as Sarah
Giovanni Calcagno as the leader of the rebels

See also
 List of Christmas films

References

External links

2019 films
Films directed by Ficarra e Picone
2010s Italian-language films
Italian fantasy comedy films
2010s science fiction comedy films
Italian Christmas comedy films
2010s Christmas comedy films
Films about time travel
2010s Italian films